Karl Bohusch (18 May 1916 – 31 May 1962) was an Austrian gymnast. He competed in eight events at the 1948 Summer Olympics.

References

External links
 

1916 births
1962 deaths
Austrian male artistic gymnasts
Olympic gymnasts of Austria
Gymnasts at the 1948 Summer Olympics
20th-century Austrian people